FC Prometei Dniprodzerzhynsk was a Ukrainian football club from Kamianske, Dnipropetrovsk Oblast. The club founded in 1991. In 1947–70 there was another city club SC Prometei Dniprodzerzhynsk.

The club was founded in March 1991 by the city authorities and the Kamianske Industrial Institute. The club was based on the youth team "Burevisnyk" of the city sports school. The new club replaced another Kamianske club "Radyst". After few seasons in the Ukrainian competitions the club went bankrupt and folded in 1996.

League and cup history

Soviet Union
{|class="wikitable"
|-bgcolor="#efefef"
! Season
! Div.
! Pos.
! Pl.
! W
! D
! L
! GS
! GA
! P
!Soviet Cup
!colspan=2|Europe
!Notes
|-
| align=center|1991
| align=center|5
| align=center|6
| align=center|
| align=center|
| align=center|
| align=center|
| align=center|
| align=center|
| align=center|
| align=center|
| align=center|
| align=center|
| align=center|
|}

Ukraine
{|class="wikitable"
|-bgcolor="#efefef"
! Season
! Div.
! Pos.
! Pl.
! W
! D
! L
! GS
! GA
! P
!Domestic Cup
!colspan=2|Europe
!Notes
|-
| align=center|1992–93
| align=center|4
| align=center|18
| align=center|34
| align=center|4
| align=center|9
| align=center|21
| align=center|26
| align=center|68
| align=center|17
| align=center|not played
| align=center|
| align=center|
| align=center bgcolor=red| Relegated
|-
| align=center|1993–94
| align=center|5
| align=center|5
| align=center|28
| align=center|15
| align=center|4
| align=center|9
| align=center|26
| align=center|28
| align=center|34
| align=center|not played
| align=center|
| align=center|
| align=center|Group 4
|-
| align=center|1994–95
| align=center|5
| align=center|11
| align=center|30
| align=center|12
| align=center|4
| align=center|14
| align=center|39
| align=center|48
| align=center|40
| align=center|not played
| align=center|
| align=center|
| align=center bgcolor=green| Group 5 – Promoted
|-
| align=center|1995–96
| align=center|3
| align=center|20
| align=center|38
| align=center|1
| align=center|1
| align=center|38
| align=center|10
| align=center|81
| align=center|4
| align=center|preliminary
| align=center|
| align=center|
| align=center bgcolor=red| Group B – Withdrew
|}

See also
 SC Prometei Dniprodzerzhynsk
 FC Stal Kamianske

References

External links
 1992–93 season in the Fourth Division
 1992–93 season in the Fourth Division

 
Defunct football clubs in Ukraine
Association football clubs established in 1991
Association football clubs disestablished in 1996
1991 establishments in Ukraine
1996 disestablishments in Ukraine
Football clubs in Kamianske